Aasmund Olavsson Vinje (6 April 1818 – 30 July 1870) was a Norwegian poet and journalist who is remembered for poetry, travel writing, and his pioneering use of Landsmål (now known as Nynorsk).

Background
Vinje was born into a poor but well-read family in Vinje, Telemark. He had a voracious appetite for learning and supported himself in part by teaching. He earned his university entrance exam after attending the same school as Henrik Ibsen, studied law, and became an attorney.

Career
In 1858 Vinje founded the periodical Dølen (The dales-man), in which he published travel accounts and editorial comments on art, language and politics that serve as records for the period in which he lived. Dølen ceased publication in 1870.

Vinje did much to articulate the difference between urban and rural life in Norway and was among the sophisticated exponents of Norwegian romantic nationalism. But he was also known for his critical scepticism and "dual vision"—looking at both sides of the coin. He was politically active to the extent that the government fired him as an attorney for criticizing its foreign policy.

The work deals more warm-heartedly with the ordinary people he met on his journey than with the royalty he encountered at the coronation.

In 1863 he wrote A Norseman's View of Britain and the British, which was translated into Norwegian ten years later.

Grieg set many of Vinje's poems, and in 1881 published  (English: Twelve melodies to Poems of A. O. Vinje, for voice and piano), Opus 33, which includes The Last Spring and At Rondane.

Dying of stomach cancer, Vinje decided to spend his last days in the countryside. He died as a guest of his friend, minister (later bishop) Anton Christian Bang at Gran in Hadeland on 30 July 1870 and is buried nearby in the churchyard of the Sister churches at Granavollen. In 1873,  a large monument with a bust of Vinje by Brynjulf Bergslien was erected at the site.

Today, there are Vinje paths in several Norwegian cities and towns, including Oslo, Stavanger, Trondheim, Moss, Fjellhamar,  Corby, Hamar, Gjøvik, Rjukan, Skien and Mandal.

Slogan
A 2014 Dagsavisen article said that Vinje coined the most Norwegian of slogans, "": "It is so important to enjoy oneself!"

Selected works
  (1853)
 (1861)
A Norseman's View of Britain and the British (1863)
 (1864)
 (1866)
  (1867)
 (1868)
  (1869)

Memorials
 In 1918, a statue of Vinje was erected  in Skien
 In 1947, a bronze statue in full figure by Knut Skinnarland  (1909–1993) was placed at the Vinjar community hall in Vinje, near Vinjestoga
 In 1959, a memorial was raised  to  Vinje at Eidsbugarden where he had a private hut
 In 1968 for  the 150th anniversary of Vinje's birth the Posten Norge released a stamp with a portrait of Vinje
 In 1968, a statue of Vinje by Dyre Vaa was erected in Sogn Student Village in Oslo
 In 1984, Vinje was depicted on Norges Bank's 50-krone note

See also
Vinjerock

References

Other sources
 Glienke, Bernhard  (1999) Vinje in London (Frankfurt: Peter Lang in  Metropolis und nordische Moderne) Norwegian
 Vesaas, Olav  (2001)  A.O. Vinje. Ein tankens hærmann  (Oslo: Cappelen) Norwegian
Langslet, Lars Roar; Jon H. Rydne   (1993)   Villmann, vismann og veiviser : en essaysamling om A. O. Vinje  (Oslo, Cappelen)    Norwegian
Glomnes, Eli; Øyvind T. Gulliksen; Olav Solberg  (1992)  At føle paa nationens puls : åtte artiklar om Aasmund O. Vinje  (Oslo, Novus)   Norwegian

External links
Digitized books by Vinje in the National Library of Norway
  A. O. Vinje in Tønsberg Norwegian

1818 births
1870 deaths
People from Vinje
Nynorsk-language writers
Norwegian essayists
Norwegian travel writers
Norwegian language
Norwegian male poets
Norwegian newspaper editors
Deaths from stomach cancer
19th-century Norwegian journalists
Male journalists
19th-century Norwegian poets
Male essayists
19th-century Norwegian male writers
19th-century essayists